The 2014–15 season of the Hoofdklasse is competed in six leagues, three Saturday leagues and three Sunday leagues. The champions of each group will be promoted directly to the 2015–16 Topklasse. The 2014–15 Hoofdklasse started on Saturday 6 September 2014.

Teams

Saturday A

Saturday B

Saturday C

Sunday A

Sunday B

Sunday C

League tables

Saturday A

Saturday B

Saturday C

Sunday A

Sunday B

Sunday C

Promotion/relegation play-off Topklasse – Hoofdklasse

First round 
The 3 period winners of each league are grouped together and play a semi-competition to decide which of the three continues to the second round. Each team plays one match at home and one match away.

Saturday A

Saturday B

Saturday C

Sunday A

Sunday B

Sunday C

Second and Final round 
The 3 remaining teams from the Saturday leagues and the team ranked 13th in the 2014–15 Topklasse Saturday league play in a knock-out system for 1 spot in the 2015–16 Topklasse Saturday league.
Likewise, the 3 remaining teams from the Sunday leagues and the team ranked 13th in the 2014–15 Topklasse Sunday league play in a knock-out system for 1 spot in the 2015–16 Topklasse Sunday league.
For details and results see 2014–15 Topklasse promotion/relegation play-offs.

Promotion/relegation play-off Hoofdklasse – Eerste Klasse

Saturday 
The teams ranked 11th and 12th of each of the 3 Saturday leagues (6 teams) and the 3 period winners of each of the 5 Saturday Eerste Klasse leagues (15 teams), making a total of 21 teams are grouped in 7 groups of 3 teams in  such a way that the Hoofdklasse teams each end up in a different group. In each group the 3 teams play a semi-competition in such a way that each team plays one match at home and one match away.
The 7 group winners will play next season in the 2015–16 Hoofdklasse and the remaining teams in the 2015–16 Eerste klasse.

Group 1

Group 2

Group 3

Group 4

Group 5

Group 6

Group 7

Sunday 
The teams ranked 11th and 12th of each of the 3 Sunday leagues (6 teams) and the 3 period winners of each of the 6 Sunday Eerste Klasse leagues (18 teams), making a total of 24 teams, play in a 2-round 2 leg knockout system in such a way that the Hoofdklasse teams can never meet each other.
The 6 winners of the second round matches will play next season in the 2014–15 Hoofdklasse and the remaining teams in the 2014–15 Eerste klasse.

Updated to games played on 7 June 2015.Source:

References 

2014-15
Neth
4